Matthew William Dixon (born 12 June 1992) is an Australian cricketer who has played for Western Australia and the Perth Scorchers domestically.

From Perth, Dixon played cricket for Western Australia at both under-17 and under-19, and also represented the Australian Under-19 cricket team in five One-Day Internationals in 2009, taking three wickets. A right-arm fast bowler, he made his Futures League debut for the Western Australia Under-23s in February 2010, and subsequently made his List A debut for Western Australia against Victoria in October 2010, taking a wicket with his fifth ball and finishing with 1/39 overall. He played two more matches in the 2010–11 Ryobi One-Day Cup before making his first-class debut against New South Wales in March 2011, taking two wickets.

In 2016 Dixon was signed by Essex on a two-year contract to play for them in all formats of the game. As a British passport holder Dixon is not regarded as an overseas player for English domestic cricket purposes. Dixon made his Essex debut against Cambridge MCCU at Fenner's on 31 March 2016.

References

External links

1992 births
Australian cricketers
Cricket Australia XI cricketers
Living people
Sportsmen from Western Australia
Western Australia cricketers
Perth Scorchers cricketers
Cricketers from Perth, Western Australia
Essex cricketers
Durham cricketers